Sympistis dunbari is a moth of the family Noctuidae first described by Leon F. Harvey in 1876. It is found in wet coastal forests of North America, west of the Cascade Mountains, as far north as British Columbia, south to Utah, California and Arizona.

Oncocnemis definita, was formerly considered a synonym of Oncocnemis dunbari, but is now considered a separate species, Sympistis definita.

The wingspan is about 34 mm.

The larvae feed on the foliage of Holodiscus discolor.

If disturbed, the caterpillar of this species will leap two or three inches upwards.

References

External links

Macromoths of Northwest Forests and Woodlands
Information about larval stage

dunbari
Moths of North America
Fauna of California
Moths described in 1876